Cassinia scabrida commonly known as rough cassinia, is a species of flowering plant in the family Asteraceae and is endemic to forests with rocky granite outcrops in north-eastern Victoria, Australia. It is an erect shrub with hairy foliage, linear leaves, and large numbers of greenish-white heads of flowers arranged in dense corymbs.

Description
The heads are arranged in groups of hundred to thousands in corymbs  in diameter.

Taxonomy and naming
Cassinia scabrida was first formally described in 2004 by Anthony Edward Orchard in Australian Systematic Botany from specimens collected near Corryong in 2004. The specific epithet (scabrida) means "somewhat rough".

Distribution and habitat
Rough cassinia grows in the shrubby understorey of forests, near granite outcrops in mountain areas of north-eastern Victoria.

References

scabrida
Asterales of Australia
Plants described in 2004
Flora of Victoria (Australia)